Mikhail Petrovich Vorobyov (December 29, 1896 – June 12, 1957) was a Soviet Marshal of the engineer troops from the start of World War II (1941–1945) – inspector-general of engineer troops, then chief of engineer troops of the Western Front, and later commander of the 1st Field Engineer Army (1944).

Early life
Mikhail Petrovich Vorobyov was born December 29, 1896, in Khasavyurt, Terek Oblast. He came from the family of a prominent railway engineer.

Military service
In 1916, Vorobyov was drafted into the Russian Imperial Army.

He joined the Red Army in 1918.

In the Battle of Moscow, he was one of the leaders in building defenses on the approaches to Moscow and engineer support of the West Front offensive.

In April 1942, he became commander of engineer troops of the Red Army. He headed the building of defenses near Stalingrad, coordinated actions of the engineer troops of the Leningrad and Volkhov fronts in lifting the Leningrad blockade; did a great amount of work in preparing defenses in the Battle of the Kursk Bulge and made a tangible contribution to engineering support in crossing major water obstacles, especially the Dnieper. He left his position in 1952.

References

Bibliography

 
 
 

1896 births
1957 deaths
People from Khasavyurt
Soviet Marshals of Engineer Troops
Recipients of the Order of Lenin
Recipients of the Order of the Red Banner
Recipients of the Order of the Red Banner of Labour
Recipients of the Order of Suvorov, 1st class
Soviet military engineers
Soviet military personnel of the Russian Civil War
Soviet military personnel of the Winter War
Soviet military personnel of World War II

Burials at Novodevichy Cemetery